In enzymology, a putrescine N-methyltransferase is an enzyme that catalyzes the chemical reaction

S-adenosyl-L-methionine + putrescine  S-adenosyl-L-homocysteine + N-methylputrescine

Thus, the two substrates of this enzyme are S-adenosyl methionine and putrescine, whereas its two products are S-adenosylhomocysteine and N-methylputrescine.

This enzyme belongs to the family of transferases, specifically those transferring one-carbon group methyltransferases.  The systematic name of this enzyme class is S-adenosyl-L-methionine:putrescine N-methyltransferase. This enzyme is also called putrescine methyltransferase.  This enzyme participates in alkaloid biosynthesis ii.

This enzyme is important in the synthesis of many plant alkaloids. It evolved from spermidine synthase.

References

 

EC 2.1.1
Enzymes of unknown structure